Rafael Ithier Natal
(born August 29, 1926) is a Puerto Rican salsa musician and the founder of the highly successful orchestra El Gran Combo. Ithier was born in Río Piedras, now a part of the municipality of San Juan. In 2016, Ithier celebrated his 90th birthday and was interviewed by a news outlet in Puerto Rico about his contributions to Puerto Rican music.

Early years
Raised in Río Piedras, Puerto Rico, he showed a passion for music at a very young age. His father was Nicolas Ithier and his mother Mérida Natal. His uncle, Salvador Ithier, played music together with Rafael Hernández, another of Puerto Rico's music legends. He served in the United States Army during the Korean War.  While stationed in Korea he formed a music group entitled the Los Borinquena Mambo Boys.

Musical career
Ithier Nadal became an expert guitarist in the bolero genre, and he was a member of the Tito Henriquez group, Taone. His sister Esperanza later inspired him to learn how to play the piano.

Ithier Nadal and his namesake, Rafael Cortijo, knew each other and formed a friendship at an early age; rumors of animosity would later surface but they both denied it, saying they considered themselves to be "like brothers." Ithier Nadal joined Cortijo's orchestra, "Cortijo y su Combo", during the 1950s. Before that, he was in a New York group named the "Borinqueneers Mambo Boys."

In 1977 Ithier Nadal worked as a music arranger on the debut album for the Puerto Rican ensemble band "Puerto Rico All Stars".

El Gran Combo
In 1962, Ithier Nadal formed "El Gran Combo", becoming the orchestra's leader. As of 2012, he was still the orchestra leader and continued to tour with the group. On his 90th birthday he was interviewed and stated that  was successful because of their great discipline.

References

Notes

See also
List of Puerto Ricans
French immigration to Puerto Rico
 Guaguancó
 Son cubano
 Salsa
 Afro-Cuban jazz

1926 births
Living people
20th-century Puerto Rican musicians
People from Río Piedras, Puerto Rico
Puerto Rican people of African descent
Latin music record producers
Puerto Rican military officers
Puerto Rican Army personnel
United States Army soldiers
United States Army personnel of the Korean War